PRISMA may refer to:
 Preferred Reporting Items for Systematic Reviews and Meta-Analyses, an academic reporting standard
 PRISMA (spacecraft), an Italian Space Agency mission